Parisot may refer to:

People 
 Aldo Parisot (1918–2018), Brazilian-born American cellist and cello teacher
 Dean Parisot, Academy Award winning American film and television director
 Jean Parisot de Valette (1494–1568), Grand Master of the Knights Hospitaller from 1557
 Laurence Parisot (born 1959), head of the French MEDEF employers' union since 2005
 Mademoiselle Parisot (1775–after 1837), aFrench ballet dancer
 Pascal Parisot (born 1963), French songwriter and singer
 Patrick Parisot, Canadian diplomat, currently ambassador to Algeria

Places in France 
 Parisot, Tarn, a commune in the Tarn department
 Parisot, Tarn-et-Garonne, a commune in the Tarn-et-Garonne department

Other 
Parisot (horse), thoroughbred racehorse that won 1796 Epsom Oaks